Aitor Galdós Alonso (born November 9, 1979) is a Spanish professional road bicycle racer who last rode for UCI Professional Continental team .

Major results 

 1997
  U19 Cyclo-Cross Champion (1997)
 2004
 1st, Overall Giro del Lago Maggiore
 1 stage in Tour of Maroc
 1 stage in Circuito Montañés
 2006
 1 stage in Tour of Denmark
 1 stage in Tour de Wallonie
2009
 7th, Milan-San Remo
2012
1st Sprints classification Vuelta a Burgos

External links 
Profile at Euskaltel-Euskadi official website 

Cyclists from the Basque Country (autonomous community)
Spanish male cyclists
1979 births
Living people
People from Ermua
Sportspeople from Biscay